The following is a list of episodes for the IMAGI animated television series Zentrix. The series has 26 episodes.

Episode list

See also
 Zentrix
 List of characters in Zentrix

Zentrix